Pilodeudorix leonina, the dark round-spot, is a butterfly in the family Lycaenidae. It is found in Guinea, Sierra Leone, Ivory Coast, Ghana, Nigeria, Cameroon, the Republic of the Congo, the Central African Republic, the Democratic Republic of the Congo (Uele, Ituri and Sankuru) and Uganda. The habitat consists of primary forests and secondary forest with a closed canopy.

Subspecies
Pilodeudorix leonina leonina (Guinea, Sierra Leone, Ivory Coast, Ghana)
Pilodeudorix leonina dimitris (d’Abrera, 1980) (Nigeria: south and the Cross River loop, western Cameroon)
Pilodeudorix leonina indentata Libert, 2004 (south-eastern Cameroon, Congo, Central African Republic, Democratic Republic of the Congo, western Uganda)

References

Butterflies described in 1904
Deudorigini